The 15th constituency of Paris is a French legislative constituency in the Paris département (75). Like the other 576 French constituencies, it elects one MP using the two-round system.
The constituency is in the East of the city, but before the 2010 redistricting of French legislative constituencies, it was based in the west, covering areas now in the 14th and 4th constituencies.

Historic representation

Election results

2022

 
 
 
 
 
 
 
 
|-
| colspan="8" bgcolor="#E9E9E9"|
|-
 
 

 
 
 
 
 

* PS candidate, not supported by NUPES, but supported by her own party; the only dissident candidate supported by a party within the NUPES alliance.

2021 by-election

2017

 
 
 
 
 
 
 
 
|-
| colspan="8" bgcolor="#E9E9E9"|
|-

2012

 
 
 
 
 
 
|-
| colspan="8" bgcolor="#E9E9E9"|
|-

2007
Elections between 1988 and 2007 were based on the 1988 boundaries.

 
 
 
 
 
|-
| colspan="8" bgcolor="#E9E9E9"|
|-

2002

 
 
 
 
 
 
 
 
|-
| colspan="8" bgcolor="#E9E9E9"|
|-

1997

 
 
 
 
 
|-
| colspan="8" bgcolor="#E9E9E9"|
|-

References

Government of Paris
15